The VII International Chopin Piano Competition was held from 21 February to 16 March 1965 in Warsaw. The competition was won by Martha Argerich of Argentina, becoming the first and so far only South American winner.

Awards 

The competition consisted of three elimination stages and a final with six pianists.

The following prizes were awarded:

Two special prizes were awarded:

Jury 
The jury consisted of:
  Zbigniew Drzewiecki (chairman)
  Jan Ekier
  Yakov Flier (vice-chairman)
  Arthur Hedley (vice-chairman)
  Jan Hoffman
  Pal Kadosa
  Eugene List
  Ivo Maček
  Nikita Magaloff
  
  Vlado Perlemuter
  Frantisek Rauch
  
  Veselin Stoyanov
  Magda Tagliaferro
  Sigismund Toduță
  
  Amadeus Webersinke
  Maria Wiłkomirska
  Bolesław Woytowicz
  Jerzy Żurawlew

References

Further reading

External links 
 

 

International Chopin Piano Competition
1965 in music
1965 in Poland
1960s in Warsaw
February 1965 events in Europe
March 1965 events in Europe